Mexico will participate at the 2017 Summer Universiade in Taipei, Taiwan.

Medalists 

| width="78%" align="left" valign="top" |

| width="22%" align="left" valign="top" |

Competitors

Archery

Recurve

Compound

Athletics 

Key
Note– Ranks given for track events are within the athlete's heat only
Q = Qualified for the next round
q = Qualified for the next round as a fastest loser or, in field events, by position without achieving the qualifying target
DNF = Did not finish
NM = No mark
DSQ = Disqualified
N/A = Round not applicable for the event

Men
Track & road events

Field events

Combined events

Women
Track & road events

Field events

Baseball 

Group stage

Consolation round

5th-8th place

7th place

Final rank
8th

Basketball

Men's tournament 

Preliminary round

|}

9th–16th place

9th–12th place

11th place game

Final rank
11th

Diving 

Men

Women

Mixed

Fencing 

Women

Football

Men's tournament

Preliminary round

Quarterfinals

Semifinals

Bronze medal match

Final rank

Women's tournament

Preliminary round

Quarterfinals

5th–8th place semifinals

7th place match

Final rank
7th

Golf

Gymnastics

Artistic

Rhythmic

Individual finals

Judo

Roller Sports 

EL = Eliminated

Swimming 

Men

Women

Table tennis

Taekwondo 

Men

Women

Poomsae

Tennis

Volleyball

Men's tournament 

Preliminary round

|}

|}
9th–16th place quarterfinals

|}
13th–16th place semifinals

|}
13th place match

|}
Final rank
14th

Women's tournament 

Preliminary round

|}

|}

9th–16th place quarterfinals

|}

13th–16th place semifinals

|}

15th place match

|}

Final ranking
15th

Weightlifting

References

External links
Overview - Mexico

Nations at the 2017 Summer Universiade
Mexico at the Summer Universiade
2017 in Mexican sports